The Vetta del Vallone is a mountain of the Lugano Prealps on the Swiss-Italian border. It is located between the Valle Morobbia (Ticino) and the Val Cavargna (Lombardy).

SOIUSA classification 
According to the SOIUSA (International Standardized Mountain Subdivision of the Alps) the mountain can be classified in the following way:
 main part = Western Alps
 major sector = North Western Alps
 section = Lugano Prealps
 subsection = Prealpi Comasche
 supergroup = Catena Gino-Camoghè-Fiorina
 group = Gruppo Camoghè-Bar
 subgroup = Sottogruppo del Camoghè
 code = I/B-11.I-A.2.a

References

External links
 Vetta del Vallone on Hikr

Mountains of the Alps
Mountains of Ticino
Mountains of Lombardy
Italy–Switzerland border
International mountains of Europe
Two-thousanders of Italy
Mountains of Switzerland